William Lyon Phelps (January 2, 1865 New Haven, Connecticut – August 21, 1943 New Haven, Connecticut) was an American author, critic and scholar. He taught the first American university course on the modern novel. He had a radio show, wrote a daily syndicated newspaper column, lectured frequently, and published numerous books and articles.

Early life and education 

Phelps' father Sylvanus Dryden Phelps was a Baptist minister, and the family had deep ancestral roots in Massachusetts Bay Colony. William, as a child, was a friend of Frank Hubbard, the son of Langdon Hubbard, a lumber merchant who founded Huron City, Michigan. Phelps earned a B.A. and graduated Phi Beta Kappa from Yale in 1887, writing an honors thesis on the Idealism of George Berkeley. He earned his Ph.D.in 1891 from Yale and in the same year his A.M. from Harvard. He taught at Harvard for a year, and then returned to Yale where he was offered a position in the English department. He taught at Yale until his retirement in 1933.

Phelps was engaged to marry Frank's sister Annabel when Langdon Hubbard died. Annabel inherited the family estate and William christened it "The House of the Seven Gables,” after the Nathanial Hawthorne story of the same name. Her father built the house in 1882 on a bluff overlooking Lake Huron. The couple was married on the estate on December 21, 1892 and it became their summer home.

Phelps converted the space in front of the house from a trotting track into a private 18-hole golf course in 1899. and they lived there part-time from 1893 through 1933, when he retired, and full-time through 1938. They had no children.

Academic and professional life 

Phelps was very athletic and played what was then the new game of baseball as well as golf and lawn tennis. He studied novelists like Leo Tolstoy and Ivan Turgenev. During his first year at Yale he offered a course in modern novels. This brought the university considerable attention nationally and internationally which upset his tenured peers at Yale. He agreed to give up the course for a while to avoid the media attention. Responding to popular demand by his students,  and to avoid scrutiny, he taught the same course outside the official curriculum. Once the unfavorable attention died down, he was appointed Lampson Professor of English Literature in 1901.

Phelps' courses became the most popular and well attended on campus. He had an engaging speaking style and was personally involved with what he taught. He wrote about English and European literature. During trips to Europe he met many of the leading writers of the turn of the 19th century.

Phelps taught at Yale for 41 years before retiring in 1933. From 1941 to 1943 he was the director of the Hall of Fame for Great Americans.

Public speaking and writing 

Phelps could be an incandescent and inspirational orator, drawing large audiences wherever he spoke.  He lectured on the famous Town Hall Lecture circuit nationwide.  During the summer of 1922, the pastor of the Huron City Methodist Episcopal Church asked him to preach regularly for the season.  He had previously preached there occasionally, and his afternoon services started to attract large crowds. The little church was remodeled twice in 1925 and again in 1929 to accommodate the crowds. His wife's parents made substantial contributions that made the expansions possible.

At the height of his speaking popularity, from 800-1,000 people attended his summer services. Some first-hand accounts describe overflow crowds sitting outside the packed church so they could listen through the windows. He became known throughout the world as a leading literary scholar, educator, author, book critic, and preacher.

After his retirement from Yale, he continued to present public lectures, radio talks, and write a daily newspaper column about books and authors. He continued to give a series of Sunday sermons each summer and offer a 20-week lecture course in literature during the winter. He presented several college commencement addresses each year and served as a judge of the Pulitzer Prize for literature and on book club selection committees.

Legacy

During his time as a Yale professor, Phelps invited a number of the Senior Class' notable students together  in 1884 and founded The Pundits. They dined weekly at Mory's, a private club adjacent to the campus. The group regularly lampooned the campus with elaborate pranks.  Among the notable members of the Pundits was composer Cole Porter

Phelps encouraged Alexander Smith Cochran to dedicate the Cochran family's extensive collection of Shakespearean folios and other rare books to endow a private club for the arts and humanities. This became the Elizabethan Club which is still active as of 2021.

In 1938, Life magazine ran an article profiling Phelps' life. His wife Annabel died of a stroke in 1939 and William died in 1943. Phelps bequeathed the house to his niece Carolyn Hubbard Parcells Lucas. In 1951, a museum was opened in the home to house Phelps’ library and to focus on the history of Huron City. In 1964, the Pointe aux Barques Life Saving Station house was moved here. In 1987, Carolyn Lucas died, and the William Lyon Phelps Foundation took over the house and museum.

Quotes 
"Music is essentially the manly art... In the entire history of music, in all times and countries, there had never been a woman able to write first-rate music."

The professor asked his students to discuss the poet Gerard Manley Hopkins' "sprung rhythm" technique. One young man handed in his exam reading, "Only God knows the answer to your question. Merry Christmas." Professor Phelps returned the paper after Christmas with the note, "Happy New Year. God gets an A—you get an F."

Publications 
His works include:

 The Beginnings of the English Romantic Movement: A Study in Eighteenth Century Literature (1893)
 Essays on Modern Novelists (1910)
 Essays on Russian Novelists (1911)
 Essays on Books (1914)
 The Advance of the English Novel (1916)
 The Advance of English Poetry in the Twentieth Century (1918)
 Archibald Marshall A Realistic Novelist (1919)
 Essays on Modern Dramatists (1921–1922)<
 Some Makers of American Literature (1923)
 As I Like It (1923)
 Essays on Things (1930)
 What I Like (in Prose) (1933)
 Autobiography with Letters (1939)
 Marriage (1940)
 A Private Library (1933)

References

External links 

 William Lyon Phelps papers (MS 578). Manuscripts and Archives, Yale University Library. 
 William Lyon Phelps Papers. Yale Collection of American Literature, Beinecke Rare Book and Manuscript Library.

 
 
 

1865 births
1943 deaths
American non-fiction writers
Harvard University alumni
Yale University alumni
Writers from New Haven, Connecticut
People from Huron County, Michigan
Members of the American Academy of Arts and Letters